Saint-Laurent-de-Brèvedent is a commune in the Seine-Maritime department in the Normandy region in northern France.

Geography
The commune has a TER railway station and a reservoir providing water for the city of Le Havre.

History
The village is named after Lawrence of Rome, patron of the village church. The word "Brévedent" probably has its origins in an early Germanic language as beber (beaver) and daum (river), which can be translated as "beaver river" . 
The village grew during medieval times, with the construction of the first church in the 12th century. Only the original tower still remains, the rest having been completely rebuilt between 1865 and 1879.  
Unusually, a school has existed here since the Middle Ages, even if it functioned erratically. It was replaced by a new building in 1789, during the French Revolution, then again in 1892 and finally rebuilt in 1994. 
The commune enjoyed considerable tourism during the second half of the nineteenth century  and the first half of the twentieth century, as the opening of the railway station in 1847 allowed the residents of Le Havre to spend weekends here in holiday villas, some of which can still seen in the district of Catillon (now nicknamed the "Riviera"). 
During the Second World War the area, with the calm of the countryside, became a place of refuge for the people of Le Havre, with its proximity and ease of access, far from the industrial and military targets of the large port.

Heraldry

Population

Places of interest
 The nineteenth-century chateau of Aplemont.
 William Malet a companion of William the Conqueror, built himself a castle at Graville and a Motte-and-bailey Castle in Aplemont, France (Normandy).
 The church of St. Laurent, dating from the twelfth century.
 The reservoir and the woods.

See also
Communes of the Seine-Maritime department

References

External links

 Official website of the commune 

Communes of Seine-Maritime